Gillian Johnston was a chemist and shop worker from Northern Ireland who was murdered by the IRA on 18 March 1988; she was aged 21 at the time of her murder.

Overview
Johnston was a 21-year-old chemist and shop worker from Tonaghgorm, Legg, near Belleek, County Fermanagh. She was engaged for two years, having dated her fiancé since she was fifteen. Johnston and her fiancé were sitting in her father's car, outside her home, when members of the IRA murdered her by firing 27 bullets into Gillian, killing her and wounding her fiancé.

After

The IRA later claimed the murder was a mistake and that the intended target had been Johnston's brother, whom they had claimed was a member of the Ulster Defence Regiment (UDR). The IRA later stated it had been mistaken about Johnston's brother, as well.

The IRA disbanded the unit which carried out the attack in reaction to public revulsion at the killing of Johnston and the killing of Harry Keys. The Gardaí linked a man in his mid-20s, a key member of the Ballyshannon ASU, to the murders of Keys, Johnston, and of William Hassard and Frederick Love. There was unconfirmed speculation that this unit was also responsible for the Remembrance Day bombing in Enniskillen in November 1987. Johnston was described by her employer as:

See also
 Jeffery Agate (PIRA murder victim)
 Killings of Nick Spanos and Stephen Melrose
 Murder of Jean McConville
 Murder of Thomas Oliver

References

Sources
 McKittrick, Kelters, Feeney, Thompson. Lost Lives: The stories of the men, women and children who died as a result of the Northern Ireland troubles (1999/2006); 

1988 murders in the United Kingdom
1988 in Northern Ireland
20th century in County Fermanagh
Terrorism deaths in Northern Ireland
Female murder victims